Yevdokiya Isaevna Grekhova (— 31 March 1992) was a milkmaid and livestock foreman on the "Karavaevo" farm who was twice awarded the title Hero of Socialist Labour. There is a bust in her memory in the village of Karavaevo.

See also
 List of twice Heroes of Socialist Labour

References 

1907 births
1992 deaths
Heroes of Socialist Labour
Recipients of the Order of Lenin